Pygarctia murina, the mouse-colored euchaetias, is a moth in the family Erebidae. It was described by Richard Harper Stretch in 1885. It is found in the United States in south-western Utah, from southern Colorado to south-eastern California and in southern Texas.

The wingspan is 26–33 mm. Adults are on wing from late July to September.

Larvae feed on Euphorbia species and have also been reared on Funastrum species. They are purple brown or blue gray with a narrow lemon-yellow subdorsal stripe and a wide yellow stripe below the spiracles. There are black pencil tufts and longer white hairs. The head is dark orange with orange hairs. They reach a length of about 22 mm when fully grown. Pupation takes place in a silken cocoon within surface debris.

References

Arctiidae genus list at Butterflies and Moths of the World of the Natural History Museum

Moths described in 1885
Phaegopterina